The Visual Effects Society Award for Outstanding Animated Character in a Photoreal Feature is one of the annual awards given by the Visual Effects Society starting from 2002. Since its inception, the award's title has gone through six different title changes, and one major category shift. First awarded in 2002, the award was titled "Outstanding Character Animation in a Live Action Motion Picture" and given to the best character animation in a live action film, with no specific character cited. This would change in 2004, when the category was re-titled "Outstanding Performance by an Animated Character in a Live Action Motion Picture", and given to visual effects artists for work on a specified character. The category was again re-titled in 2008, this time to "Outstanding Animated Character in a Live Action Feature Motion Picture". In 2014, it was titled "Outstanding Performance of an Animated Character in a Photoreal/Live Action Feature Motion Picture", but changed in 2016 to "Outstanding Animated Performance in a Photoreal Feature" and once again in 2017 to its current title.

Winners and nominees

2000s
Outstanding Character Animation in a Live Action Motion Picture

Outstanding Performance by an Animated Character in a Live Action Motion Picture

Outstanding Animated Character in a Live Action Feature Motion Picture

2010s

Outstanding Performance of an Animated Character in a Photoreal/Live Action Feature Motion Picture

Outstanding Animated Performance in a Photoreal Feature

Outstanding Animated Character in a Photoreal Feature

2020s

Superlatives

Films with Multiple Nominations
2 Nominations
 Charlotte's Web (2006) 
 Dawn of the Planet of the Apes*
 Harry Potter and the Deathly Hallows – Part 1*
 The Hobbit: An Unexpected Journey
 The Jungle Book (2016)*
 War for the Planet of the Apes*

Characters with Multiple Awards
3 Wins
 Caesar

2 Wins
 Davy Jones

External links
 Visual Effects Society

References

A
Awards established in 2002